Ileana Jacket (also Ileana Jacquet; born 30 January 1947) is a German-born Venezuelan actress. She made her debut in 1982 in the telenovela Jugando A Vivir playing Briggitte and has since participated in several telenovelas throughout Latin America. Jacket is the mother of actress Sonya Smith.

Early life 
Jacket was born on 30 January 1947 in Leverkusen, Germany. Her father was born to his Finnish mother and French father, while her mother is a German born and raised in Argentina, fluent in Spanish. Jacket already spoke Spanish through her mother, she migrated to Venezuela with her parents. Aside from Spanish and native German, she is fluent in Finnish, French and English.

Career 
In 1983, Jacket joined the cast of Leonela where she played Miss Raitza. The telenovela was very successful in Venezuela and Latin America. In 1985, she was cast in Cristal is as Bertha Girot.

Jacket has also had roles in Maria Celeste and Corazon Valiente.

Filmography

References

External links 

1947 births
Living people
German emigrants to Venezuela
German people of Argentine descent
German people of Finnish descent
German people of French descent
German Protestants
Naturalized citizens of Venezuela
People from Leverkusen
Venezuelan people of Argentine descent
Venezuelan people of Finnish descent
Venezuelan people of French descent
Venezuelan people of German descent
Venezuelan Protestants
Venezuelan telenovela actresses
20th-century Venezuelan actresses
21st-century Venezuelan actresses